Alan Hunt was formerly the Chancellor's Professor of Sociology and Law at Carleton University. He had a B.A. Hons. in Sociology; LL.B.; Ph.D. in Sociology (University of Leeds, UK).

His main fields of research interests included legal theory, sociology of law, the relationship between legal and social theory, social regulation and the way in which law interacts with other forms of control, with a particular interest in the regulation of consumption (e.g. alcohol, tobacco, etc.).  He researched the relationship between moral and legal regulation with particular reference to the control of sexuality, prostitution and pornography.  In addition, he was the founding chair of the Critical Legal Conference.

Books
 Governing Morals: A Social History of Moral Regulation, Cambridge University Press, Cambridge, 1999.
 Governance of the Consuming Passions: A History of Sumptuary Regulation, Macmillan, London, 1996.
 Foucault and Law: Towards a New Sociology of Law as Governance (with Gary Wickham), Westview Press, Boulder, Co., 1994.

References

Living people
Alumni of the University of Leeds
Canadian legal scholars
Canadian sociologists
1942 births